Alice Vrielink is a structural biologist and Professor of Structural Biology in the School of Molecular Sciences at the University of Western Australia. She is known for her work determining the structures of macromolecules such as enzymes and nucleic acids.

Education
Vrielink earned a Bachelor of Science in Chemistry and Masters of Science in Physical Chemistry at the University of Calgary in Canada. For her master's research she worked on ligands of angiotensin, a hormone involved in regulating blood pressure. She received a PhD in 1989 from the University of London where she worked on the structure of cholesterol oxidase. She also has a Diploma in Crystallography from the Imperial College of Science and Technology.

Career
Vrielink was an Assistant and Associate Professor at McGill University in Canada from 1994 to 2001. From 2000 until 2007 she served as a Research Professor at the University of California, Santa Cruz and then joined the faculty at University of Western Australia as Professor of Structural Biology in 2007.

Vrielink was a member of the 2014 National Committee on Crystallography She is a past president of the Society of Crystallographers of Australia and New Zealand (SCANZ).

Research 
Vrielink conducts research in protein biochemistry and crystallography with a special focus on understanding the structural determinants governing enzyme chemistry. Vrielink's early research centered on the three-dimensional structure of the enzyme cholesterol oxidase first in Brevibacterium and then in Streptomyces.

She has been involved in projects that have established the structure of compounds including L-amino-acid oxidase, prions, and snake venom. In 2017, she mapped the molecular structure of EptA, a protein that shields superbugs from antibiotics. This work has been covered by the BBC, ABC, Times Higher Education, The West Australian, and Particle. Subsequent work on EptA has revealed why it may be a good target for drug development.

Selected publications

References

External links
 Faculty page
 Lab group page
 Vrielink's obituary for David Blow, her Ph.D. advisor
 

Australian biochemists
Australian women chemists
Living people
Year of birth missing (living people)
Academic staff of the University of Western Australia
Canadian emigrants to Australia
University of Calgary alumni
Canadian crystallographers
Alumni of the University of London